Rational Machines is an enterprise founded by Paul Levy and Mike Devlin in 1981 to provide tools to expand the use of modern software engineering practices, particularly explicit modular architecture and iterative development. It changed its name in 1994 to Rational Software, and was sold for US$2.1 billion (equivalent to current US$) to IBM on February 20, 2003.

See also

Rational Automation Framework
Rational ClearCase
Rational DOORS
Rational Performance Tester
Rational Rhapsody
Rational Rose
Rational Software Architect
Rational Software Modeler
Rational Synergy
Rational Unified Process

References

External links

Defunct software companies of the United States
IBM acquisitions